A special election for Michigan's 13th congressional district was held on November 6, 2018, following the resignation of Democratic U.S. Representative John Conyers.

The Democratic primary was held on August 7, 2018. No Republican candidate ran in the special election, making the win in the Democratic primary tantamount to election in this district. Both the primary for this election and primary for the regular election were concurrent; similarly, the special election was held the same day as regular election. The winner of the regular Democratic primary was former state Representative Rashida Tlaib, who went on to win the regular general election.

The winner of the special Democratic primary was Detroit City Council President Brenda Jones, who served only from November 29, 2018 to January 3, 2019, the last day of Conyers' 27th term.

Background
Incumbent U.S. Representative John Conyers announced on December 5, 2017, that he would resign after a sexual harassment scandal. He had represented the 13th and its predecessors since 1965 (it was numbered as the 1st from 1965 to 1993 and as the 14th from 1993 to 2013), and was the longest-serving member of the House at the time.

Three days after Conyers' resignation, Governor Rick Snyder set a date for the special election. It was scheduled for November 6, 2018, concurrent with the regular election for a full two-year term. Primaries were held August 7. The filing deadline for candidates was April 24, 2018. As a result, the 13th's seat remained vacant for nearly a year.

Republican primary

Candidates

Failed to qualify 

 David Dudenhoefer, author and photographer

Democratic primary

Candidates

Declared
Ian Conyers, state senator
 Brenda Jones, president of the Detroit City Council
 Rashida Tlaib, former state representative
 Bill Wild, Mayor of Westland

Failed to qualify 

 John Conyers III, hedge fund manager (running as an Independent)
Kimberly Hill Knott, government relations, environmental justice

Withdrew 

 Michael Gilmore, attorney and activist

Declined
 Warren Evans, Wayne County Executive
 Greg Mathis, television personality and former judge
 Horace Sheffield, pastor and candidate for MI-13 in 2014
Coleman Young II, state senator and candidate for Mayor of Detroit in 2017 (running for MI-13 regular election)
Shanelle Jackson, former state representative and candidate for MI-13 in 2012 (running in MI-13 regular election)

Endorsements

Results

General election

Campaign
Brenda Jones won the Democratic primary for the special election, but lost the Democratic primary for the regular election to Rashida Tlaib. Both the special primary and regular primary were held concurrently. Jones won the special election on November 6, and served for just over eight weeks.

Predictions

Results

References

External links
Official campaign websites
Brenda Jones (D) for Congress

2018 2018 13
Michigan 13
Michigan 2018 13
Michigan 13
United States House of Representatives 13
United States House of Representatives 2018 13
November 2018 events in the United States